The crash of Alaska Airlines Flight 60 was an accident involving a Boeing 727-81 of the American airline Alaska Airlines at Ketchikan International Airport in Ketchikan, Alaska, United States, on April 5, 1976, resulting in the death of a passenger with 32 serious and 17 minor injured survivors among the initial 50 passengers and crew on board.

Crew 
On its final journey, Flight 60 was under the command of 55-year-old captain Richard L. Burke, who had a total of 19,813 hours of flight experience, including 2,140 hours on the Boeing 727-81 and had been in service with Alaska Airlines since 1960. While 42-year-old co-pilot Richard Bishop had a total of 3,193 total flight hours of experience, including 1,980 hours on the Boeing 727-81 and had been in service with Alaska Ailrines since 1966. 43-year-old Second officer Huston Leach was employed by Alaska Airlines in the same year as co-pilot Bishop, had accumulated 3,454 total flight hours, including 2,641 hours on the Boeing 727–81.

Accident 
Having originated in Anchorage, Alaska, Alaska Airlines Flight 60 took off from Juneau International Airport in Juneau, Alaska, at 7.38 am on April 5, 1976, on a scheduled flight to Seattle, Washington, with a final stopover at Ketchikan International Airport, Ketchikan, Alaska, carrying 7 crew and 43 passengers.

At 8.05 am, Anchorage air traffic control cleared Flight 60 for an approach to runway 11 at Ketchikan. At 8.11 am, Flight 60 started its descend from  towards runway 11 for an ILS approach under low cloud ceilings and low visibility conditions due to light snow and fog.

Upon landing, the captain reversed the engines and deployed the ground spoilers alongside the wheel brakes. However, the braking actions were poor due to the runway being wet at the time of landing. The captain thereby ordered a go-around and retracted the ground spoilers before setting the flaps to 25°, however the thrust reverser mechanism failed to fully disengage, meaning that the plane couldn't obtain full takeoff speed. Further attempts by the crew to disengage the reversers were equally unsuccessful, so the captain abandoned the go-around and deployed the ground spoilers again in another attempt to slow the aircraft down. Upon realising that the aircraft wasn't going to come to a halt before the end of the runway was reached, the captain turned the plane to the right and raised the nose. Shortly thereafter, the aircraft overran the runway and passed over a gully and a service road before striking the airport's antenna array support and crashing in a ravine some  beyond the end of runway 11.

Following the crash, flight 60's fuselage was broken up in three pieces just before and beyond the wings, with the wing-section catching fire soon after the crash. Rescue personnel quickly arrived on the scene and almost all passengers and crew managed to evacuate the aircraft before it caught on fire. Firefighters were able to keep the fire at bay long enough for the pilots to be rescued from the cockpit about half an hour after the crash. All three pilots were seriously injured in the crash with captain Burke receiving multiple fractures to his legs and ribs, co-pilot Bishop suffering skull, rib, leg and spinal fractures and second officer Leach receiving multiple spinal fractures. Amongst the remaining crew, two were seriously injured while the remaining two received minor injuries. In the case of the passengers, 27 suffered from serious injuries and the remaining 15 received minor injuries, while 85-year-old Ruth Foster of Nyssa, Oregon was the only person to lose their life in the crash.

Aircraft 
The Boeing 727–81 involved, N124AS (msn 18821/124) conducted its first flight on March 4, 1965. At the time, the aircraft was registered as JA8301 and operated by All Nippon Airways. On May 31, 1972, the aircraft was reregistered as N124 and operated by Pacific Southwest Airlines before being leased to Alaska Airlines on June 22 of that same year. It was subsequently subleased to Mexicana on November 30, 1972, and reregistered as XA-SEB. The aircraft was returned to Alaska Airlines on January 10, 1974, and had its old registration as N124 reinstated. From December 14, 1975, until the time of the accident, the aircraft was registered as N124AS and in service of Alaska Airlines. At the time of the accident, the aircraft had a total of 25,360 total airframe hours.

Aftermath 
The aircraft was damaged beyond repair in the post-crash fire, while 49 out of its 50 occupants survived the accident with 32 them receiving various injuries. An investigation of the accident by the NTSB which lasted 261 days and was published on December 22, 1976, determined that captain Burke's faulty judgement to initiate a go-around after having committed to a full stop landing following an excessively long and fast approach and touchdown, was the main cause of the accident. The NTSB report also stated that the captain's unprofessional decision to abandon the precision approach contributed to the accident. Soon following the crash, captain Burke decided to retire from Alaska Airlines.

References 

Airliner accidents and incidents caused by pilot error
1976 in the United States
1976 in Alaska
Aviation accidents and incidents in 1976
Aviation accidents and incidents involving runway overruns
Accidents and incidents involving the Boeing 727
Aviation accidents and incidents in the United States in 1976
Aviation accidents and incidents in Alaska
Alaska Airlines accidents and incidents
April 1976 events in the United States
April 1976 events